The Navia is a river in northern Spain flowing South to North from Galicia into 
the Autonomous Community of Asturias. It discharges into the Bay of Biscay through an estuary called Ría de Navia.

See also 
 List of rivers of Spain
 Rivers of Galicia

External links
 Official website 

Rivers of Spain
Rivers of Asturias
Rivers of Galicia (Spain)

fr:Navia (bromeliacée)